Cloghan may refer to:

Cloghan, County Donegal
Cloghan, County Londonderry, a townland in County Londonderry, Northern Ireland
Cloghan, County Offaly
Cloghan, County Roscommon

See also
Cloghane, County Kerry